Žabinka is a city in Brest Region, Belarus. It is the administrative center of Zhabinka District. The population is 14,577.

History

Within the Grand Duchy of Lithuania, Žabinka was a part of Brest Litovsk Voivodeship. In 1795, Žabinka was acquired by the Russian Empire as a result of the Third Partition of Poland. The name of the place was first mentioned in Russian official papers in 1817.

In 1882, a railway station was built here on the railway line that connected Warsaw, Brest and Moscow. It gave a powerful impetus to the development of the place. Within 2 decades Žabinka turned from a village into a town, attracting people of commerce, after the station boosted the economic development of the place.

From 1921 until 1939, Žabinka was part of the Second Polish Republic. In September 1939, Žabinka was occupied by the Red Army and, on 14 November 1939, incorporated into the Byelorussian SSR.

From 23 June 1941 until 21 July 1944, Žabinka was occupied by Nazi Germany and administered as a part of the Generalbezirk Wolhynien-Podolien of Reichskommissariat Ukraine.

For 125 years, the town has been sprawling along the road from the railway station southwards to the highway Brest-Moscow, that is the major transcontinental traffic artery E30 today. After World War II a big sugar refinery was built north of the railway line. A big settlement appeared around it.

Today Kirov Street starts form the railway station, runs across the town center with a big square and a park, further on southwards to the highway.

Notable residents
In 2004, a Polish woman named Floria Budziszewska, who risked her life to save two Jewish children in Žabinka, was posthumously awarded the Righteous Among Nations title.

Geography
Žabinka is located on the Muchaviec River at the confluence of the tiny Žabinka River, which is considered rather a creek. The town has the biggest in the district water reservoir Vizzhar (25 ha), which is located in the western part of the town.

There is a big square and a park in the center of the town.

The town occupies 9.11 km2.

References

External links
 views of the town

Cities in Belarus
Populated places in Brest Region
Brest Litovsk Voivodeship
Grodno Governorate
Polesie Voivodeship
Zhabinka District